Amir Zazai (born 27 July 2001) is an Afghan cricketer. He made his first-class debut for Mis Ainak Region in the 2017–18 Ahmad Shah Abdali 4-day Tournament on 29 April 2018. In the second innings, he took 6 wickets for 51 runs, and was named the man of the match. He made his List A debut for Paktia Province in the 2019 Afghanistan Provincial Challenge Cup tournament on 31 July 2019.

References

External links
 

2001 births
Living people
Afghan cricketers
Mis Ainak Knights cricketers
Place of birth missing (living people)